The following is a list of the monastic houses in Shropshire, England.

See also
 List of monastic houses in England
 List of monastic houses in Wales

Notes

References

Sources

Medieval sites in England
Houses in Shropshire
Shropshire
 
Shropshire
Lists of buildings and structures in Shropshire